Made In Heaven is a 2019 Indian romantic drama web series that premiered on Amazon Prime Video on 8 March 2019. Produced by Excel Entertainment, the series chronicles the lives of Tara and Karan, two wedding planners in Delhi running an agency named Made in Heaven. The series is Amazon Video’s fourth original fictional Indian series and stars Arjun Mathur, Sobhita Dhulipala, Jim Sarbh, Shashank Arora, Kalki Koechlin and Shivani Raghuvanshi.

Zoya Akhtar and Reema Kagti created the show, and they wrote it with Alankrita Shrivastava. Akhtar, Shrivastava, Nitya Mehra, and Prashant Nair served as directors for the nine-episodes of the first season. Work on the second season was to begin in April 2020 but was postponed due to the COVID-19 pandemic.  Filming for the second season of the show was wrapped in April, 2022.

Plot
Made in Heaven portrays today’s India as a  blend of old and new, where tradition and modern aspirations are at loggerheads. The show and protagonists' narratives play out against the backdrop of lavish and expensive weddings.

Cast

Main
Sobhita Dhulipala as Tara Khanna 
Arjun Mathur as Karan Mehra
Kalki Koechlin as Faiza Naqvi
Jim Sarbh as Adil Khanna
Shashank Arora as Kabir Basrai
Shivani Raghuvanshi as Jaspreet "Jazz" Kaur

Recurring
Neel Madhav as Arjun Mehra
Vijay Raaz as Jauhari
Zachary Coffin as Adam
Natasha Singh as Shibani Bagchi
Vinay Pathak as Ramesh Gupta
Dalip Tahil as Kishore Khanna
Yashaswini Dayama as Mitali Gupta
Manini Mishra as Vimala Singh
Ayesha Raza Mishra as Renu Gupta
Suchitra Pillai as Mani Pandey
Denzil Smith as Mr Swarup
Lushin Dubey as Sheila Naqvi
Saket Sharma as young Karan 
Shalva Kinjawadekar as young Nawab
Siddharth Bhardwaj as Inspector Chauhan
Ankur Rathee as Sam
Sahidur Rahaman as Nadeem Mechanic
Mona Singh (Season 2)

Guest
Deepti Naval as Gayatri Mathur
Aman Bhagat as Rahul Mathur
Rahul Vohra as Bijoy Chatterjee
Purnendu Bhattacharya as Raghvendra Roshan
Neena Gupta as Veenu Roshan 
Pavail Gulati as Angad Roshan
Aditi Joshi as Aliya Saxena
Pulkit Samrat as Sarfaraz Khan 
Manjot Singh as Joginder Sethi
Dalai as Harsimran Mann
Ravish Desai as Vishal Shrivastava
Shweta Tripathi as Priyanka Mishra 
Preetika Chawla as Geetanjali Sinha
Shishir Sharma as Mr. Sinha
Dhairya Karwa as Samar Ranawat
Rajnish Jaiswal as Jeet Gill
Yaaneea Bharadwaj as Sukhmani Sadana
Tanmay Dhamania as Nikhil Swarup
Amrita Puri as Devyani Singh 
Maanvi Gagroo as Tarana Ali
Vijay Gupta as Khalil Ansari
Trisha Kale as Asma Ansari
Anhad Singh as Utsav
Rasika Dugal as Nutan Yadav
Siddharth Menon as John Matthew
Vikrant Massey as Nawab Khan 
Anjum Sharma as Vishal Singh
Aakriti Sharma as Mira
Neelam Kothari (Season 2)
Sanjay Kapoor (Season 2)
Samir Soni (Season 2)

Episodes

Promotion and release
The official trailer of the web series  was  released on 15 February 2019. The web series released on 8 March 2019 on Prime Video.

Reception
The show has received largely positive reviews with several critics and online reviews praising the series' dark take on the Big Fat Indian Wedding. Soumya Srivastava of Hindustan Times gave Made In Heaven four stars out of five, terming it the best desi original by Amazon Prime. Srivastava opines that Zoya Akhtar and Reema Kagti’s new show will keep you hooked. 

Sanjukta Sharma of Scroll.in praised the performances, writing, "...performances, especially by Mathur and Dhulipala, engagingly and steadfastly chart a convincing trajectory of early struggles, promise, dysfunction, despair and uplifting resignation. The show's costumes received major acclaim as well with fashion critic, Shivani Yadav doing a complete episode-by-episode analysis on her blog Critic Corner."

Ektaa Malik from The Indian Express stated the series works because all the characters, big and small, have their development curve etched well. The strong performances make each episode stand out.

Critics have described it as a telling story about human nature and greater social dynamics in Delhi.

Awards & Nominations

Soundtrack

The music is composed by Sagar Desai, Dub Sharma, Balkrishan Sharma and Sherry Mathews. Songs are rendered by Rituraj, Farad Bhiwandiwala and Viba Saraf. Qawwali "Aye re sakhi more piya ghar aaye" is rendered by Nizami Brothers and chorus "Perfect Love" by Aadya Jaswal, Avika Diwan and Mehak Sanghera. Lyrics for "Jiya Jaye" and "Musafir" have been written by Amanda Sodhi.

Notes

References

External links

2019 Indian television series debuts
Amazon Prime Video original programming
Hindi-language television shows
Television shows set in Uttar Pradesh
Indian LGBT-related television shows
Television shows set in Mumbai
Television shows set in Punjab, India
Television shows set in Delhi
Indian drama television series
Wedding television shows